Lee Hyun-joo may refer to:

 Lee Hyeon-ju (born 1953), South Korean figure skater
 Lee Hyun-joo (volleyball) (born 1976), South Korean volleyball player
 Lee Hyun-joo (actress) (born 1998), South Korean actress, singer and model
 Lee Hyun-ju (footballer) (born 2003), South Korean footballer